Round Rock Independent School District (RRISD) is a school district headquartered in the city of Round Rock, Texas, United States. As of 2022, the school district serves over 48,000 students, prekindergarten through grade 12.

Student enrollment for the 2021–2022 school year is 48,421. Round Rock ISD employs approximately 6,750 employees.

History
On May 17, 1913, the Williamson County government approved incorporation of Williamson County Common School District #19, forming RRISD. Originally, the district consisted of only two schools.

Schools

Public schools of choice
Round Rock ISD public schools of choice provides students access to innovative programming that engages and taps into their specific interests, aspirations and preferred learning styles.

Secondary schools

High schools
 Cedar Ridge High School (CRHS)
Success High School (SHS), a Round Rock ISD public school of choice
 Early College High School (ECHS), a Round Rock ISD public school of choice that provides students with up to 60 college credit hours towards a bachelor's degree
 McNeil High School (MHS), a Capital Area Regional Day School for the Deaf (9-12). 
 Round Rock High School (RRHS)
 Stony Point High School (SPHS), a Round Rock ISD public school of choice featuring the IB Diploma Program
 Westwood High School (WHS), a Round Rock ISD public school of choice featuring the IB Diploma Program

Middle schools
C.D. Fulkes Middle School
Canyon Vista Middle School
Cedar Valley Middle School
Chisholm Trail Middle School
Deerpark Middle School and Capital Area Regional Day School for the Deaf (6-8)
Grisham Middle School, a Round Rock ISD public school of choice featuring the IB Secondary Years Program School
Hernandez Middle School, a Round Rock ISD public school of choice featuring the IB Secondary Years Program School
Hopewell Middle School
Pearson Ranch Middle School
Ridgeview Middle School
Walsh Middle School

Alternative schools

 GOALS Learning Center (GOALS)
Round Rock Opportunity Center (RROC)

Primary schools

Elementary schools
Anderson Mill Elementary School, a Round Rock ISD public school of choice featuring the IB Primary Years Program
Claude Berkman Elementary Arts Integration Academy, a Round Rock ISD public school of choice
 Blackland Prairie Elementary School and Leadership Academy, a Round Rock ISD public school of choice
Bluebonnet Elementary School
 Brushy Creek Elementary School
 Cactus Ranch Elementary School
 Caldwell Heights Elementary School, a Round Rock ISD public school of choice featuring the IB Primary Years Program
Neysa Callison Elementary School
Canyon Creek Elementary School
 Kathy Caraway Elementary School (formerly North Oaks Elementary. Name changed in 2005.)
Chandler Oaks Elementary School, a Round Rock ISD public school of choice featuring the IB Primary Years Program
Deep Wood Elementary School
 Double File Trail Elementary School and Leadership Academy, a Round Rock ISD public school of choice
 Elsa England Elementary School, a Round Rock ISD public school of choice featuring Project Lead the Way
Fern Bluff Elementary School
 Forest Creek Elementary School
 Forest North Elementary School
 Gattis Elementary School
Great Oaks Elementary School and Leadership Academy, a Round Rock ISD public school of choice
Linda Herrington Elementary School
 Joe Lee Johnson Elementary STEAM Academy, a Round Rock ISD public school of choice
 Jollyville Elementary School
 Laurel Mountain Elementary School
Live Oak Elementary School and Capital Area Regional Day School for the Deaf (K-5)
Old Town Elementary School
 Pond Springs Elementary School
 Purple Sage Elementary School
 Vic Robertson Elementary School
Patsy Sommer Elementary School
Spicewood Elementary School, a Round Rock ISD public school of choice featuring the IB Primary Years Program
 Teravista Elementary School and Leadership Academy, a Round Rock ISD public school of choice
 Union Hill Elementary School
Xenia Voigt Elementary School
Wells Branch Elementary Arts Integration Academy, a Round Rock ISD public school of choice
Redbud Elementary - Approved in 2018 Bond election, opened for the 2021–2022 school year

Alternative school
Elementary Disciplinary Alternative Education Program (DAEP)

Statistics

Demographics
 African American: 9.0%
 Hispanic: 30.7%
 White: 38.2%
 American Indian: 0.4%
 Asian: 17.7%
 Pacific Islander: 0.2%
 Two or more races: 4%

Governance
The Round Rock Independent School District is governed by a seven-member Board of Trustees, who are elected at-large to serve staggered four-year terms. As of December 2022, the board is composed of:

Special Facilities

The Round Rock Independent School District has 14 special facilities as of January 2022.

Performing Arts Centers 

 Raymond E. Hartfield Performing Arts Center
 Auditorium at Cedar Ridge High School
 Auditorium at Stony Point High School

Transportation Centers 

 Transportation East Facility
 Transportation West Facility

Athletic Stadiums 

 Kelly Reeves Athletic Complex
 Dragon Stadium - Located at Round Rock High School
 Aquatics Practice Facility - Approved in 2018 Bond Package

See also

List of school districts in Texas

References

External links
Round Rock ISD website
Campus boundary maps
News Article on Academic Report, 2012-2013

 
School districts in Williamson County, Texas
School districts in Travis County, Texas
Round Rock, Texas
Cedar Park, Texas
1913 establishments in Texas
Education in Austin, Texas